Out of Here is the third album by the London-based acid jazz band Corduroy, released  in 1994.

The album reached No. 73 in the UK Albums Chart in October 1994. The single "Mini" reached No. 76 in the UK Singles Chart and has been included on many Acid Jazz compilation albums. The album also features a cover of Lemmy's Motorhead, which reached No. 82 in the UK Singles Chart. The album was reissued on vinyl by Acid Jazz Records in 2018.

Reception
AllMusic awarded the album 3 stars. Clark Collis from Select rated the album 2 out of 5, calling "Motorhead" "rather excellent", but saying "Other than that, it's difficult not to concur with the band's obvious wish that they'd been around 20 years ago. And not bothering us now." In his review for Louder Than War, Matt Mead states: "Out of Here features mostly full vocal songs, brothers Addison leading the way here with their Stevie Wonder/Manfred Mann type duel vocals", while he describes the single "Mini" as "a bonafide cult classic tune".

Track listing

Personnel
Corduroy
Ben Addison – vocals, drums
Scott Addison – vocals, keyboards
Simon Nelson-Smith – guitars
Richard Searle – bass guitar

Chart positions

Album charts

Single charts

References

1994 albums
Corduroy (band) albums
Acid Jazz Records albums